The Hunslet Mill and Victoria Works Complex is a series of very large disused mill buildings in Goodman Street in Leeds.

History
Hunslet Mill was constructed by William Fairbairn for John Wilkinson and completed circa 1842. By 1847 some 1,500 female staff were employed in the mill reeling flax. It was occupied by a firm of linen manufacturers called Richard Buckton and Son from 1868 and then by a firm of blanket weavers called Dodgson and Hargreaves from the mid-1920s until it closed in 1966.

Victoria Works was constructed for W B Holdsworth and was completed in 1838. It was occupied by a tailoring company called Botterill & Senior from the 1930s and later was owned by a firm of ironmongers called R H Bruce before they moved out in the early 1970s.

The complex, which had been derelict ever since, was purchased by developers Evans Property Group and Caddick Developments. However these development plans ultimately failed to commence, meaning that the complex remained derelict until the current developers, JM Construction, bought the site in the mid 2010s.

As of 2017, construction started to redevelop the mill complex. The development, which is called Victoria Riverside, is scheduled for completion by the end of 2023.

References

Textile mills in West Yorkshire
Buildings and structures in Leeds
Linen industry
Former textile mills in the United Kingdom
Listed buildings in Leeds